Yasuraoka (written: 安良岡) is a Japanese surname. Notable people with the surname include:

, Japanese classical composer
, Japanese professional wrestler

Japanese-language surnames